King Dagobert may refer to:
 Dagobert I (603-639), king of Austrasia and the Franks
 Dagobert II (650-679), king of Austrasia
 Dagobert III (699-715), Merovingian king of the Franks
  "Le bon roi Dagobert" (song), 18th century French satirical song

See also
 Dagobert (disambiguation)